John Franklyn Mars (born October 15, 1935) is an American businessman and heir. He is the chairman of Mars, Inc. As of October 2022, Bloomberg Billionaires Index estimated his net worth at US$53 billion, ranking him the 21st-richest person in the world (tied with his sister Jacqueline).

Early life
John Franklyn Mars was born on October 15, 1935. He is the son of Audrey Ruth (Meyer) and Forrest Mars, Sr., and grandson of Frank C. Mars, founders of the American candy company Mars, Incorporated. Mars graduated from the Hotchkiss School in Lakeville, Connecticut in 1953 and Yale University.

Career
As a member of the Mars family, his share of the company and other assets were worth US$10 billion in September 2010, making him the 52nd richest person in the world and the 26th richest person in America, according to Forbes. As of October 2012, Mars is listed as the 30th richest person in the world with an estimated net worth of 20.1 billion.

According to the Hurun Global Rich List 2015, he was 28th richest person in the world with a net worth of US$26 billion. In 2016, his net worth went up to $29 billion and the 19th richest person in the world.

In January 2017, he paid $7.7 billion for VCA, Inc, a pet care company.

Personal life
He married Adrienne Bevis in June 1958. They have three children: Linda Anne Mars born , Frank Edward Mars born , and Michael John Mars born .

He formerly lived in Fairfax County, Virginia but now resides in Jackson, Wyoming. In the 2010 to 2014 Forbes rankings of personal wealth, Mars was the highest ranked person whose photograph was unavailable to the magazine.

In March 2015, Queen Elizabeth II awarded him an honorary knighthood at Windsor Castle.

References

1935 births
Living people
Businesspeople in confectionery
Mars family
American billionaires
Hotchkiss School alumni
Yale University alumni
Place of birth missing (living people)
Honorary Knights Commander of the Order of the British Empire
20th-century American businesspeople
21st-century American businesspeople